The Tokyo Daishōten (東京大賞典) is a Japanese thoroughbred horse race  on dirt track for three years old and above. It is run over a distance of 2,000 meters (about 10 furlongs) at Ōi Racecourse in  the Shinagawa, Tokyo in the end of the year.

It was first held in 1955, at that time named Aki-no-Kura (秋の鞍), meaning 'The Race of Autumn race meeting', with a distance of 2,600 meters. In 1966, its name was changed to Tokyo Daishōten.
Since 2011, It has been held as international Grade 1 race (The only international race in Japan not organized by Japan Racing Association).

The race provides an alternative to the February Stakes and to the Dubai World Cup Night's meetings for Japanese horses.
 
Its distance has been changed three times. From 1962 to 1988, it was 3,000 meters long, from 1989 to 1997, 2,800 meters and after 1998, 2,000 meters.

Gold Allure, Vermilion, Kane Hekili, Hokko Tarumae, Copano Rickey won the race on the way to winning the JRA Award for Best Dirt Horse.

Records
Most successful horse (4 wins):
 Omega Perfume – 2018, 2019, 2020, 2021 - the first in Japan to win the same international Grade I race fourth times in a row.

Other multiple winners (2 wins):
 Adjudi Mitsuo – 2004, 2005
 Smart Falcon – 2010, 2011
 Hokko Tarumae – 2013, 2014

Winners since 1990

See also
 Horse racing in Japan
 List of Japanese flat horse races

References 

Racing Post: 

Open middle distance horse races
Horse races in Japan
Dirt races in Japan